John Maurice Palacio (born 24 April 1967) is a Belizean sprinter. He competed in the men's 4 × 100 metres relay at the 1992 Summer Olympics.

References

External links
 

1967 births
Living people
Athletes (track and field) at the 1991 Pan American Games
Athletes (track and field) at the 1992 Summer Olympics
Belizean male sprinters
Olympic athletes of Belize
Place of birth missing (living people)
Pan American Games competitors for Belize